Cherry Blossom Memories is a 2015 Japanese youth drama music film directed by , written by  and starring Maika Yamamoto and . It is based on Sakura no Ame, a 2012 novel based on the 2008 Hatsune Miku song of the same title by halyosy. It had its world premiere at the Panorama section of the 28th Tokyo International Film Festival on October 29, 2015. It was released in Japan on March 5, 2016.

Plot
Miku is a 2nd year high school student. Her school is located on the beach of a small town. She is a member of the school's chorus club. Miku is introverted, but likes singing and has feelings for Haru, the head of the chorus club. One day, Teacher Meiko, the advisor of the chorus club, decides to retire. For the last chorus competition during Teacher Meiko's tenure, she hopes the chorus club can win first place. Teacher Meiko selects a difficult song for the chorus competition which the students didn't expect. The students want to sing “Sakura no Ame” for the competition. Dissension grows within the chorus club.

Cast
Maika Yamamoto as Miku Tono
 as Haru Sakurane
 as Ren Kitamura
 as Ruka Mitsuki
Tōko Miura as Yuri Kashiima 
Daiki Nakamura
Tomoko Tabata as Meiko Takada
 as Midori Tono

See also
Zutto Mae Kara Suki Deshita (2016), another film based on Vocaloid songs
Kagerou Project, an anime series also based on Vocaloid songs

References

External links
 

2010s Japanese films
Japanese musical drama films
2010s musical drama films
Films based on Japanese novels
Films based on songs
Creative works using vocaloids
2015 drama films
2015 films